Pink's Hot Dogs is a landmark hot dog restaurant in the Fairfax District of the city of Los Angeles. It is on North La Brea Avenue, across the street from the Hollywood district on the east.

History 

Pink's was founded by Paul and Betty Pink in 1939 as a pushcart near the corner of La Brea and Melrose. The Great Depression was still having an impact on the country and money was scarce. People could purchase a chili dog made with Betty's chili recipe accompanied by mustard and onions on a steamed bun for ten cents each. As the business grew, thanks to Betty's chili and the custom-made Hoffy-brand hot dogs, with their natural sausage casings, so did Pink's. The family built the current building in 1946 at 709 North La Brea Avenue in the Fairfax District.

Today 

Pink's has named several newer menu items after Hollywood celebrities, some of whom can be seen at the restaurant. many signed celebrity photographs are hanging on the walls inside; some celebrities have signed more than one photo. The celebrity-named hot dogs are often versions ordered by the person in question, such as the "Martha Stewart Dog" with mustard, relish, onions, chopped tomatoes, sauerkraut, bacon, and sour cream. Another is the "Rosie O'Donnell Long Island Dog", which is a 10" dog topped with mustard, onions, chili, and sauerkraut. The "Huell Howser Dog" is a standard chili dog with two of the regular hot dogs on a single bun while the "Ozzy Spicy Dog" named for Ozzy Osbourne features a Polish sausage, nacho cheese, American cheese, grilled onions, guacamole and chopped tomatoes.

A smaller selection of hamburgers are available, and desserts are a choice of coconut or marble cake.

There is usually a long line of customers in front despite the lack of parking in the area. The often slow-moving line is viewed by some as part of the attraction at Pink's, especially on Friday and Saturday nights when the stand becomes packed with club and concertgoers.

Pink's has a parking lot attendant, even though parking is free. According to the menu, Pink's original signature chili dog in stretched,  form remains the stand's top seller.

During the Los Angeles Dodgers' World Series run in 2017, the restaurant changed its name to Blue's and repainted its pink and white facade for the first time in 78 years, making it blue and white and featuring Dodger logos and player names. They made a bet against Houston, Texas-based Good Dog restaurant in which the winning city would allow its customers to get free hot dogs the day after a championship win, but the Houston Astros won. The Dodgers repeated as NLCS champs the next year, and once again named it Blue's, but lost the World Series to the Boston Red Sox. Two years later, the Dodgers earned another NL pennant, and later beat the Tampa Bay Rays for the title, again naming it Blue's.

In mid-March 2020, caused by the COVID-19 pandemic, as with other restaurants, its locations indefinitely shut down indoor dine-ins. Pink's flagship location closed between mid-March to mid-August 2020 and shut down again from January 4 to February 2021.

Other locations 

In September 2009, a location opened on the Las Vegas Strip at the Planet Hollywood Hotel & Casino.

In April 2010, another location opened in Universal CityWalk [on the second level, across from the movie theaters] and introduced "The Betty White Naked Dog" (no condiments or toppings). In November 2010, a location opened at Harrah's Rincon in Valley Center. It was closed in 2018 and replaced with a Smashburger.

On June 10, 2016, Pink's opened their first international location at the Bonifacio Global City in Taguig City, Metro Manila, Philippines.

In October 2016, Pink's opened an additional location at the Del Amo Fashion Center food court in Torrance, California.

On February 22, 2019, Pink's opened their first East Coast location at the King of Prussia shopping mall in King of Prussia, Pennsylvania.

Pink's hot dogs have also been sold at amusement parks—from 2011 to 2018 at Cedar Point in Sandusky, Ohio, the first Pink's location east of Las Vegas, and since 2014 at Lake Compounce in Bristol, Connecticut.

There are also locations inside the Los Angeles International Airport (LAX), the Forum, and the T-Mobile Arena. In June 2018, locations opened at Brea Mall and the Camarillo Premium Outlets.

In popular culture 
 Pink's is prominently referenced in the Harlan Ellison short story "Prince Myshkin, and Hold the Relish"
 Pink’s restaurant in the 1998 music video "Perfect" by The Smashing Pumpkins
 Featured in the 1975 film Aloha, Bobby and Rose, in which the title characters eat at Pink's while on a date
 Seen in John Cassavetes' 1971 film Minnie and Moskowitz; Moskowitz takes Minnie there after fighting off her date. The restaurant was one of Cassavetes' favorite spots in Los Angeles.
 The Michael Burger-hosted Personals also had Pink's in the bonus round, where couples won that if time ran out and didn't match the last question
 In the 2009 novel Inherent Vice by Thomas Pynchon (set in 1970 Los Angeles) the main character, Doc, visits Pink's
 Featured in the eighth episode of 90210'''s second season, the characters Annie and Jasper are seen exiting the restaurant with their food
 Featured in the 2010 Episode 2 of the Korean reality TV series F(x)'s Koala, in which the stars of the series, K-pop girl group f(x), paid a visit to this location to eat and offer their autographed photo
 In Season 2 Episode 4 of Hell's Kitchen, Gordon Ramsay takes the chefs to Pink's to show an example of organization within an extremely high volume restaurant
 The opening credits of The Late Late Show with Craig Ferguson featured Craig Ferguson at the restaurant.  Since new host James Corden took over the show in 2015, his title sequence also features him at the restaurant.
 The restaurant was used in an episode of Nathan for You, where host Nathan Fielder attempted to attract hurried customers by offering special circumstances that enabled patrons to cut in line
 Pink's restaurant was shown as destroyed by a meteorite toward the end of the 2009 movie Meteor Apocalypse In the season II finale of the Showtime drama Ray Donavan, Ray meets Cookie Brown at Pink's, where Cookie orders the "Rosie O'Donnell with Fries"
 Pink's hosted a hot dog eating task during the finale of the third season of the Australian edition of The Amazing Race Pink's is referenced in the Big & Rich song Comin' to Your City
 Visiting... with Huell Howser Episode 731
 Pink's is seen in the Disney Channel Original Movie, Starstruck and is shown to be the favorite restaurant of the major character "Christopher Wild"
 In The Lincoln Lawyer'' season four episode "Twelve Lemmings in a Box" main character Mickey Haller takes his marquee client to Pink's for lunch

See also

 List of hot dog restaurants

References

External links 

 

1939 establishments in California
Buildings and structures in Hollywood, Los Angeles
Hot dog restaurants in the United States
Landmarks in Los Angeles
Restaurants established in 1939
Restaurants in Los Angeles